The 1945 Paris–Roubaix was the 43rd edition of the Paris–Roubaix, a classic one-day cycle race in France. The single day event was held on 9 April 1945 and stretched  from Paris to the finish at Roubaix Velodrome. The winner was Paul Maye from France.

Results

References

Paris–Roubaix
Paris–Roubaix
Paris–Roubaix
Paris–Roubaix